Federico Muñoz Fernández (born May 7, 1963 in San Andrés, Santander) is a Colombian former road racing cyclist, who was a professional from 1988 to 2004.

Career achievements

Major results

1991
 2nd Overall Vuelta y Ruta de Mexico
1st Stage 2
1992
 7th Overall Route du Sud
1993
 1st  Road race, National Road Championships
 9th Overall Vuelta a Colombia
1994
 3rd Overall Volta ao Algarve
1st Stage 2
1996
 3rd Clasica a los Puertos de Guadarrama
1999
 1st  Overall Vuelta a los Santanderes
 1st Stage 11 Vuelta a Colombia
2000
 9th Overall Vuelta a Colombia
2001
 1st Stage 13 Vuelta al Táchira
 1st Stage 11 Vuelta a Colombia
 4th Overall Vuelta a Venezuela
2002
 1st  Overall Vuelta a Venezuela
1st Stage 9a
2003
 1st Stage 11 Vuelta al Táchira
 1st Stage 3a Vuelta a Costa Rica (TTT)
 2nd Overall Vuelta a Venezuela
1st Stage 9
2004
 1st  Overall Vuelta a Venezuela
1st Stage 9a

Grand Tour general classification results timeline

References
 

1963 births
Living people
Colombian male cyclists
Colombian sportspeople in doping cases
Doping cases in cycling
Vuelta a Colombia stage winners
Vuelta a Venezuela stage winners
Sportspeople from Santander Department
20th-century Colombian people